Jarczyk is a surname. Notable people with the surname include:

 Robert Jarczyk (born 1959), German television actor
 Sławomir Jarczyk (born 1980), Polish footballer

See also
 Janczyk
 Jurczyk

Polish-language surnames